Mosu is a genus of East Asian spurred orb-weavers first described by J. A. Miller, C. E. Griswold & C. M. Yin in 2009.

Species
 it contains four species:
Mosu dayan Lin & Li, 2013 — China
Mosu huogou Miller, Griswold & Yin, 2009 — China
Mosu nujiang Miller, Griswold & Yin, 2009 — China
Mosu tanjia Lin & Li, 2013 — China

References

External links

Araneomorphae genera
Mysmenidae